Maoping is a town under the administration of Meitan County, Guizhou, China. , it has one residential community and 3 villages under its administration.

References 

Towns of Zunyi
Meitan County